Svenn Erik Bjørnstad (born 4 January 1971) is a former Norwegian ice hockey player. He was born in Oslo. He played for the Norwegian national ice hockey team at the 1994 Winter Olympics.

References

1971 births
Frisk Asker Ishockey players
Hasle-Løren IL players
Living people
Ice hockey people from Oslo
Stjernen Hockey players
Vålerenga Ishockey players
Norwegian ice hockey players
Olympic ice hockey players of Norway
Ice hockey players at the 1994 Winter Olympics